Julie Ann Goodenough  (née Roewe; born March 25, 1969) is an American college basketball coach who is currently the head women's basketball coach at Abilene Christian.

Early life and college playing career
Born Julie Ann Roewe in Dallas, Goodenough graduated from Haskell High School in Haskell, Texas in 1987 and first played college basketball at the junior college level at Western Texas College before transferring to the University of Texas at Arlington in 1989. At Texas–Arlington, Goodenough played two years at forward. She averaged 8.9 points and 4.4 rebounds as a junior in 1989–90, then 14.3 points and 5.5 rebounds as a senior in 1990–91. Goodenough graduated in 1991 with a bachelor's degree in exercise and sport science.

Coaching career
Goodenough began her coaching career as a graduate assistant at Texas–Arlington in 1991–92.  She transferred to Texas Tech University after the season to finish her master's degree in sports administration. In the 1992–93 season, the year Texas Tech Lady Raiders basketball won the NCAA championship, Goodenough was a volunteer assistant coach at nearby Lubbock Christian University and taught physical education courses at Texas Tech.

From 1993 to 2002, Goodenough was head coach at Hardin–Simmons, which transitioned from NAIA Division II to NCAA Division III in 1996. In nine seasons, Goodenough went 82–35. Under Goodenough, Hardin–Simmons made the NCAA Division III Tournament four consecutive times from 1999 to 2002, including a trip to the Elite Eight in 2000.

From 2002 to 2005, she served as the head women's basketball coach at Oklahoma State University, going 23–61 in three seasons. Goodenough resigned on March 14, 2005.

She then coached at Charleston Southern University from 2006 to 2012 before being hired at Abilene Christian in 2012.

Personal life
Julie Goodenough married school administrator Rob Goodenough in 1994. They have two children.

Head coaching record

References

External links
Abilene Christian profile
Charleston Southern profile
Oklahoma State profile
Hardin-Simmons profile

1969 births
Living people
Abilene Christian Wildcats women's basketball coaches
American women's basketball coaches
Basketball coaches from Texas
Charleston Southern Buccaneers women's basketball coaches
Hardin–Simmons Cowboys and Cowgirls
Junior college women's basketball players in the United States
Lubbock Christian Lady Chaps basketball coaches
Oklahoma State Cowgirls basketball coaches
People from Haskell, Texas
Sportspeople from Dallas
Texas Tech University alumni
Texas Tech University faculty
Western Texas College alumni
American women academics
Basketball players from Dallas